The Chrysler Akino was a concept car created by Chrysler. The Akino was first shown at the 2005 Tokyo Motor Show. The Akino was designed at Chrysler's Pacifica Studio in California and was named after the designer of the concept car, Akino Tsuchiya.

Design
The Akino was a design concept, as its engine was not tested. The Akino was designed as a modern and still artistic design for a subcompact car. It only has one door on the driver's side and two doors on the passenger's side although it has 1 suicide door. Inside, it has 4 seats and a trunk that opens upwards like most hatchbacks. The passenger doors open up in opposite directions , much like the Honda Element. The roof also features an interlocking form which could give out more headroom. If produced, the Chrysler Akino is a front-wheel-drive subcompact car and it will be a 5-door hatchback with conventional rear doors and it is produced in mid-January 2018 and it is related to the Lancia Ypsilon and the Chrysler Ypslion.

References
The Akino at ConceptCarz.com
Tokyo Motor Show 2005 Highlights for Car Design News (Including the Akino)

Akino
Front-wheel-drive vehicles
Cars introduced in 2005
Subcompact cars
Hatchbacks